Chris Alvin Sunday professionally known as Krizbeatz or KrizBeatz the drummer Boy, is a Nigerian record producer best known for producing Tekno his first single "Pana". Ranked 3rd on Pulse Nigerias 2016 list of "Top 5 Best Nigerian Music Producers", KrizBeatz has worked majorly with Yemi Alade including several artistes like Oyibo Rebel, Skales, Lil Kesh and Koker while also releasing his own single titled "Erima" and the hit single "911" featuring Yemi Alade and Harmonize which further pushed his career to limelight. The song "911" currently has over 13 million views on YouTube.

Discography

Singles
"King of New Wave" (2016)
"Erima"  (2017)
"Boss Whine"  (2017)
Riddim (feat Yemi Alade, Skales) 2020

ADM (Afro Dance Music) Album
"911" ft. Yemi Alade, Harmonize (2017)

Singles produced

Awards and nominations

References

External links

Living people
Musicians from Lagos State
University of Ibadan alumni
Nigerian hip hop record producers
1994 births